Chawanwat Srisook is a professional footballer from Thailand. He is currently playing for Navy in Thai League 2 as a right midfielder.

References

External links
 
 https://www.livesoccer888.com/thaipremierleague/2018/teams/Navy-FC/Players/Chontawat-Srisuk
 https://siamrath.co.th/n/133029

1990 births
Living people
Chawanwat Srisook
Association football midfielders
Chawanwat Srisook
Chawanwat Srisook
Chawanwat Srisook